Segmental resection (or segmentectomy) is a surgical procedure to remove part of an organ or gland, as a sub-type of a resection, which might involve removing the whole body part.  It may also be used to remove a tumor and normal tissue around it. In lung cancer surgery, segmental resection refers to removing a section of a lobe of the lung.  The resection margin is the edge of the removed tissue; it is important that this shows free of cancerous cells on examination by a pathologist.

References

External links 

 Segmental resection entry in the public domain NCI Dictionary of Cancer Terms

Surgical procedures and techniques
Surgical removal procedures